A groan is a vocalisation of the human voice.

Groan may also refer to:
Groan Tube, a prank toy
Groans of the Britons